The 2017–18 West Virginia Mountaineers women's basketball team represented West Virginia University during the 2017–18 NCAA Division I women's basketball season. The Mountaineers were coached by seventeenth year head coach Mike Carey, played their home games at WVU Coliseum and were members of the Big 12 Conference. They finished the season 25–12, 8–10 in Big 12 play to finish in sixth place. They advanced to the semifinals of the Big 12 women's tournament where they lost to Texas. They received an automatic bid to the Women's National Invitation Tournament where they defeated Bucknell, Saint Joseph's and James Madison in the first, second and third rounds, St. John's in the quarterfinals before losing to Virginia Tech in the semifinals.

Previous season
The team finished sixth in the regular season but won the 2017 Big 12 Tournament. They finished with a record of 24–11, 8–10 in Big 12 play to finish in sixth place. They received an automatic bid to the NCAA women's tournament where they defeated Elon in the first round before losing to Maryland in the second round.

Roster

Schedule

|-
!colspan=12 style=| Exhibition

|-
!colspan=12 style=| Non-Conference Games

|-
!colspan=9 style=| Conference Games

|-
!colspan=9 style=| Big 12 Women's Tournament

|-
!colspan=9 style=| WNIT

Rankings
2017–18 NCAA Division I women's basketball rankings

See also
 2017–18 West Virginia Mountaineers men's basketball team

References

West Virginia Mountaineers women's basketball
West Virginia
West Virginia Mountaineers women's b
West Virginia Mountaineers women's b
West